Brahm Dutt Dwivedi (-1997) was an Indian cabinet minister in Government of Uttar Pradesh, and a senior leader of the Bharatiya Janata Party. Dwivedi was shot dead in Farrukhabad district in February 1997. His widow Prabha later contested the election to the assembly. He protected Mayawati against physical assault during the 2 June 1995 guest house scandal.

Death
Dwivedi, who was then sitting BJP MLA from Farrukhabad, was shot in his car after attending a tilak ceremony on February 10, 1997, in City Kotwali area. His bodyguard BK Tiwari was killed in the attack, while his driver Rinku suffered injuries. Dwivedi was rushed to the local hospital, but was declared dead on arrival. Former prime minister Atal Bihari Vajpayee, former BJP president Lal Krishna Advani, former Home Minister Murli Manohar Joshi , Defence Minister Rajnath Singh, former UP chief minister Kalyan Singh and state BJP president Kalraj Mishra attended Dwivedi's funeral.

Investigation and conviction
The assassination case was investigated by the CBI. On July 17, 2003, the CBI court in Lucknow had sentenced gangster Sanjeev Maheshwari and former Samajwadi Party MLA Vijay Singh to life imprisonment in the case. Both convicts had challenged the judgment and filed an appeal in the high court. In 2017, the Lucknow bench of Allahabad High Court upheld the trial court judgment of life imprisonment. In 2018, the case moved to Supreme Court.

References

Members of the Uttar Pradesh Legislative Assembly
Bharatiya Janata Party politicians from Uttar Pradesh
State cabinet ministers of Uttar Pradesh
People murdered in Uttar Pradesh
1997 deaths
1997 murders in India
People from Farrukhabad
Deaths by firearm in India
Assassinated Indian politicians
1938 births